Paolo Luschi (born July 16, 1970) is an Italian sprint canoer who competed in the early 1990s. At the 1992 Summer Olympics in Barcelona, he finished fifth in the K-2 1000 m event.

References
Sports-Reference.com profile

External links

1970 births
Canoeists at the 1992 Summer Olympics
Italian male canoeists
Living people
Olympic canoeists of Italy
Place of birth missing (living people)
20th-century Italian people